Ovarian Psycos is a bicycle brigade established in Boyle Heights, Los Angeles, in 2010.  The group was formed to foster sisterhood that could feel comfortable taking up space as well confronting the harassment of women. Rides are organized monthly on the full moon. 
A documentary by Joanna Sokolowski and Kate Trumbull-LaValle premiered in 2016 at SXSW and was screened on March 27, 2017 on the KCET Independent Lens program.

References

External links
 Galarreta, Lori.  "Ovarian Psycos Bicycle Brigade rides to combat gentrification, violence against women and more," KPCC.
 Herwees, Tasbeeh. "Meet the All-Women Bike Crew Running Gentrifiers Out of Town." Good.
 Moritz, Katie. "Get Fired Up With the Ovarian Psycos Bicycle Brigade". Rewire.
 Reyes, Raul A. " ‘Ovarian Psycos’: Young L.A. Latinas Forge Activism, Empowerment Through Biking." NBC News.
 Rivas, Jorge. "Meet the Ovarian Psycos: women of color building a movement on bikes." Fusion.
 Ta, Amy. "Ovarian Psycos: Unapologetic women activists on two wheels," KCRW.

Boyle Heights, Los Angeles
Chicana feminism
Feminist organizations in the United States
Cycling activism
Feminist movements and ideologies
Hispanic and Latino American women's organizations
Hispanic and Latino American working class
Intersectional feminism
Hispanic and Latino American feminism
Multicultural feminism
Organizations for women of color
Transport culture
Working-class culture in California
Working-class feminism
2010 establishments in California
Organizations established in 2010
History of women in California